Jaburg Glacier is a broad glacier draining westward between the Dufek Massif and the Cordiner Peaks in the Pensacola Mountains of Antarctica. It was mapped by the United States Geological Survey from surveys and U.S. Navy air photos, 1956–66. The glacier was named by the Advisory Committee on Antarctic Names after Lieutenant Conrad J. Jaburg, U.S. Navy, a helicopter pilot with the Ellsworth Station winter party, 1957.

See also
 List of glaciers in the Antarctic
 Glaciology

References

Glaciers of Queen Elizabeth Land